Pol-e Ushan (also Romanized as Pol-e Ūshan and Polowshan; also known as Pol-e Āshan) is a village in Kuhestan Rural District, Kelardasht District, Chalus County, Mazandaran Province, Iran. At the 2006 census, its population was 82, in 17 families.

References 

Populated places in Chalus County